Oksana Lesnik (born ) is a Ukrainian female  track cyclist. She competed in the team pursuit event at the 2013 UCI Track Cycling World Championships.

References

External links
 Profile at cyclingarchives.com

1988 births
Living people
Ukrainian track cyclists
Ukrainian female cyclists
Place of birth missing (living people)
21st-century Ukrainian women